The Lester Patrick Cup was the championship trophy of the Pacific Coast Hockey League and the Western Hockey League (WHL) from 1949 to 1974.  Originally known as the Phil Henderson Cup and then in 1952 it was renamed to the President's Cup. The trophy was again renamed in 1960 to honour Pacific coast hockey pioneer Lester Patrick following his death on June 1 of that year.

The Lester Patrick Cup was retired following the demise of the WHL, and is on display at the Hockey Hall of Fame in Toronto, Ontario, Canada.

Winners
Pacific Coast Hockey League

Following the merger of the PCHL with the Western Canada Senior Hockey League in 1951, the league renamed itself the Western Hockey League for the 1952–53 season.

Western Hockey League

References
legendsofhockey.net Lester Patrick Cup at the HHOF

Canadian ice hockey trophies and awards
Western Hockey League (1952–1974)